WTPM-LD (digital and virtual channel 28) is a digital low power, religious television station located in Mayagüez, Puerto Rico. The station is owned by the Corporation of the Seventh Day Adventists of West Puerto Rico. this station is branded itself as Paraíso TV.

Digital Channels 

WTPM-LD is a Multiplex channel with four sub-channels from 28.1 to 28.4. It also have radio simulcast on 28.5.

Aborted sale to Make TV
On August 30, 2018 The Seventh Day Adventists of West PR agreed to sell WTPM-LD to Make TV Corporation. This would become sister stations of WVDO-LD and WNTE-LD. Both stations will air Salvacion TV on the main channel. The sale was completed on November 28, however the consummation has been null and the license will revert to the Seventh Day
Adventists of West PR.

References

External links 

Mayagüez, Puerto Rico
Seventh-day Adventist media
Christian television stations in Puerto Rico
Low-power television stations in the United States